The 2006 Richmond Spiders football team represented the University of Richmond during the 2006 NCAA Division I FCS football season. Richmond competed as a member of the Atlantic 10 Conference (A-10), and played their home games at the University of Richmond Stadium.

The Spiders were led by third-year head coach Dave Clawson. Richmond finished the regular season with a 6–5 overall record and a 3–5 record in conference play.

Schedule

References

Richmond
Richmond Spiders football seasons
Richmond Spiders football